Georg Meier (born August 26, 1987) is a German grandmaster of chess. He competed in the FIDE World Cup in 2009.

In December 2009, Meier tied for 1st–4th places with Julio Granda, Viktor Láznička and Kiril Georgiev in the 19th Magistral Pamplona Tournament. In 2014, he shared second place with Peter Leko in the Dortmund Sparkassen Chess Meeting, which was won by Fabiano Caruana. Meier won the main Grandmaster tournament at the 2017 Maccabiah Games in Jerusalem, ahead of Ukrainian Alexander Moiseenko.

In team events, he played for Germany in the Chess Olympiad, World Team Chess Championship, European Team Chess Championship and Mitropa Cup. His team won the gold medal in the 2011 European Team Championship in Porto Carras, Greece.

Since the season 2013/14, Georg Meier plays for the team OSG Baden-Baden in the chess Bundesliga.

Citing mobbing issues with another chess player inside the German Chess Federation, Meier announced that he would leave the federation and play for Uruguay instead. The change-over became official on Nov 1, 2021.

References

External links

 
 
 
 
 
 Interview with Georg Meier at Chessdom.com 

1987 births
Living people
Chess grandmasters
German chess players
Competitors at the 2017 Maccabiah Games
Maccabiah Games competitors for Germany
Maccabiah Games gold medalists
Maccabiah Games medalists in chess
Jewish chess players
Sportspeople from Trier